Victory War Memorial, formerly called the Cupid's bow, is a memorial in Chennai, India, originally constructed to commemorate the victory of the Allied Armies during World War I (1914–1918) and later became the victory war memorial for World War II (1939–1945), erected in the memory of those from the Madras presidency who died in the wars. Later addition includes inscriptions of 1948 Kashmir Aggression, 1962 War with China and the Indo-Pakistan War.

Location

The Victory War Memorial is located to the south of Fort St. George and marks the beginning of the 13-km-long Marina beach. It is a circular rock and marble structure built in the area that formerly housed the coastal belfry.
Within what was once called Cupid's Bow stands a flag post with the Tricolour aflutter, and a squat tower that lances the sky. Beyond the red-and-gold pennants that line the path are steps that lead to a plaque replete with the names of men from the Madras Presidency who fell in two World Wars and those that followed Independence. The towering National Flag will be visible over a long distance and would be there throughout the year.  The flag is expected to instill a feeling of oneness and patriotism amongst all the citizens and remind them about the supreme sacrifices made by our soldiers in the highest tradition of the Services. The flag mast measuring 30.5 meters in height proudly holds aloft the 20 feet by 30 feet Tricolour which adds to the grandeur of the Victory War Memorial.

See also

 Madras War Cemetery

References

Tourist attractions in Chennai
Monuments and memorials in Chennai
Indian military memorials and cemeteries
World War I memorials in India
World War II memorials